The 1902 college baseball season, play of college baseball in the United States began in the spring of 1902.  Play largely consisted of regional matchups, some organized by conferences, and ended in June.  No national championship event was held until 1947.

New programs
Baylor, Davidson, and North Carolina A&T played their first varsity seasons.

Conference winners
This is a partial list of conference champions from the 1902 season.

Conference standings
The following is an incomplete list of conference standings:

References

1902 in American sports
1902 in baseball
College baseball seasons in the United States